Transmissions from Uranus is the second full-length album by American industrial metal band Hanzel und Gretyl. It was released in 1997 via Energy Rekords. It followed the pace set by the band's debut release, Ausgeflippt, as its style was very electronically oriented. The album enjoyed significant success, with the song "9D Galactic Center" included on the soundtrack to Mortal Kombat: Annihilation. This was the band's last release on Energy Rekords, as the company went out of business in 1998. It was also the band's last release with a focus on machines and space and the last album to feature any song performed in a language other than German or English, with the song "Astronafti" performed in Greek, as their image changed radically upon the release of their third album, Über alles, which was a satire of totalitarian regimes.

The CD contained a video game named "The Alienator", which could be installed and played on computers at the time of its release.

Track listing 
 "Black Forest Galaxy" – 1:58
 "9D Galactic Center" – 1:20
 "Pleiadian Agenda" – 3:42
 "Take Me to Your Leader" – 3:55
 "Zeta Reticula" – 0:33
 "Komet Ride" – 4:29
 "Trance Planet Vortex" – 6:48
 "Robot Logik" – 3:57
 "Helium Popsicles" – 1:40
 "Starfucker" – 3:12
 "Hyper Erotic Joy Helmet" – 0:42
 "Mutant Starseed Creation" – 4:57
 "Fireball XL5" – 2:22
 "Hallo Berlin" – 1:38
 "Astronafti" – 3:37
 "Om Zentrale Station" – 7:35

Credits 
Vas Kallas: lead vocals, guitar, assistant programmer
Kaizer von Loopy: programming, guitar, backup vocals
Ginger Bread: bass
Seven: drums
Mixed by Hanzel und Gretyl and Bryce Goggin at Kinderland Studios, New York City, and Baby Monster Studios, New York City
"Hallo Berlin" sung by Kevin McGrory
Mastered by Scott Hull at Masterdisk
"The Alienator" developed by Point.Five

References 

Hanzel und Gretyl albums
1997 albums
Energy Records albums